Sir James Robert Gowan,  (December 22, 1815 – March 18, 1909) was a Canadian lawyer, judge, and senator.

Born in Cahore, County Wexford, Ireland, the son of Henry Hatton Gowan and Elizabeth Burkitt, he was educated privately in Dublin. In 1832, he emigrated to Canada and settled outside of Toronto. In 1833, he became a student in the law office of James Edward Small and later practiced law there. He married Anne Ardagh in 1854. They had no children. In 1843, he was appointed judge of the newly created Simcoe District, the largest jurisdiction in Upper Canada. He was the youngest judge ever commissioned in the British empire at the time. He retired in 1883. In 1885, he was appointed a Senator on the advice of John Alexander Macdonald representing the senatorial division of Barrie, Ontario. A Liberal-Conservative, he served for 22 until his resigning in 1907. He was created a C.M.G. in 1893 and knighted in 1905.

He was related to Ogle Robert Gowan, Emily Gowan Murphy née Ferguson, and Thomas Roberts Ferguson.

Archives 
There is a James Robert Gowan fonds at Library and Archives Canada. There is also a Gowan family fonds at the Archives of Ontario.

References

External links
 
 
 

1815 births
1909 deaths
Upper Canada judges
Canadian Knights Commander of the Order of St Michael and St George
Canadian senators from Ontario
Conservative Party of Canada (1867–1942) senators
Politicians from County Wexford
Judges in Ontario
Canadian King's Counsel
Canadian people of Irish descent